Czech immigration to Argentina began during the World War I and was divided in four periods. It is estimated that around 40,000 Czechs arrived in Argentina between then and 1970. Argentina has the largest Czech community. Czechs settled mainly in Buenos Aires, Gran La Plata, Rosario and Chaco.

Immigration Waves
There are four waves Czech immigration periods to Argentina recognized as substantial. The first was slightly before World War 1, the second from 1920 to 1930, the third during World War II and the fourth, the smallest in proportion, during 1990 (after the fall of communism in Eastern Europe). During the first two periods, the immigration group was mainly made up of workers and farmers motivated by economic reasons. During the third period, Czech political exiles arrived, fled mainly due to the Nazi encroachment in Central Europe. The smallest fourth immigration period is formed by different social classes and their immigration reasons are related to economic reasons and personal interests.

See also

Czechs

References

External links
Czech Collectivity in Argentina (in Spanish only)
 Czech Cultural Center in Buenos Aires (in Spanish and Czech only)

+
Argentina
Argentina
European Argentine